New Riegel High School is a public high school in New Riegel, Ohio.  It is the only high school in the New Riegel Local Schools district.  The school's athletic teams use the nickname Blue Jackets.  They are members of the Sandusky Bay Conference.

Ohio High School Athletic Association State Championships

 Boys Baseball – 1969

References

External links
 District Website

High schools in Seneca County, Ohio
Public high schools in Ohio